The Virginia Slims of Indianapolis is a defunct WTA Tour affiliated tennis tournament played from 1972 to 1973 and from 1983 to 1992. It was held in Indianapolis in the United States and played on indoor carpet courts from 1972 to 1973 and from 1983 to 1992. It was played on indoor hard courts from 1986 to 1992.

Katerina Maleeva was the most successful player at the tournament, winning the singles competition three times.

Results

Singles

Doubles

External links
 WTA Results Archive

 
Hard court tennis tournaments in the United States
Carpet court tennis tournaments
Indoor tennis tournaments
Defunct tennis tournaments in the United States
Virginia Slims tennis tournaments
1972 establishments in Indiana
1973 disestablishments in Indiana
1983 establishments in Indiana
1992 disestablishments in Indiana